Ramon C. Gonzalez Jr. (November 6, 1947) is a Republican member of the Kansas House of Representatives. Gonzalez is from Perry, Kansas where he serves as police chief. Elected in a special election by the Republican precinct delegates to replace Lee Tafanelli who had resigned from the State House of Representatives to become the adjutant general of Kansas.

Gonzalaez spent most of his career as an employee of Southwestern Bell from which he has retired. He also currently works as  a special investigator with the Jefferson County, Kansas Sheriff's Office.

Sources
Jan. 8, 2011 article on Gonzalez' election

1947 births
American politicians of Mexican descent
Living people
Republican Party members of the Kansas House of Representatives
People from Perry, Kansas
21st-century American politicians